Paramount Comics was a comic book imprint of Marvel Comics that was active for about two years beginning in 1996.

The imprint was the result of a deal between Marvel and Paramount Pictures to produce licensed comic book series based upon the entertainment company's franchises Mission: Impossible (in particular the soon-to-be-launched film series) and Star Trek. The agreement resulted in DC Comics and Malibu Comics abruptly losing the rights to publish their own Star Trek comics series.

The first comic published under the Paramount Comics banner was a prequel to the first Mission: Impossible film (and the first M:I comic since Dell Comics ended their series in the early 1970s). This was followed soon after by a one-shot crossover between Star Trek and Marvel's superhero team, the X-Men. After that, Marvel launched a series of comics based upon all four Trek series produced to that time, including Star Trek: Voyager, a title Malibu had been scheduled to produce but was unable due to the change of license.

Marvel also launched an original series, Star Trek: Starfleet Academy, as well as Star Trek: Early Voyages which featured the adventures of Captain Christopher Pike and his crew.

The agreement between Paramount and Marvel hit some major snags after about a year, resulting in Paramount withdrawing support for non-series based characters and storylines. As a result, both Early Voyages and Starfleet Academy were abruptly cancelled in the midst of their respective story arcs. Marvel phased out the Paramount Comics banner and their remaining Star Trek titles lasted for about another year before ending in 1998. The Star Trek license was subsequently picked up by DC's WildStorm Productions imprint. The Paramount Comics logo continued to be used in Wildstorm's Star Trek comics, although it was only featured on the interior title page, not on the cover as it was with Marvel.

Besides Trek, Mission: Impossible and a one-shot starring Snake Plissken, Paramount Comics published The Mighty Heroes, a one-shot based on the animated series. An ongoing Mission: Impossible series had been announced, but only the one-shot was ever published.

Years after the demise of Paramount Comics, Marvel again made a deal with the studio; this time, Paramount would be the distributor for a number of the Marvel Cinematic Universe's feature films produced by Marvel's film production unit, Marvel Studios, until The Walt Disney Company took over from Paramount, following the acquisition of Marvel by Disney.

References

External links
 Paramount Comics on Wayback Machine

Marvel Comics imprints
Paramount Pictures
Publishing companies established in 1996
Mass media companies disestablished in 1998